The Tamron 18-270mm F/3.5-6.3 Di II VC PZD is a superzoom lens for APS-C DSLR cameras, announced by Tamron on December 9, 2010. The Sony/Minolta A mount version is simply called Tamron 18-270mm F/3.5-6.3 Di II PZD as it lacks image stabilisation (VC, or Vibration Compensation, in Tamron classification).

Compared to its predecessor, the Tamron AF 18-270mm F/3.5-6.3 Di II VC LD Aspherical (IF) MACRO, it is considerably reduced in size and features an ultrasonic motor (Piezo Drive in Tamron nomenclature).

References

http://www.dpreview.com/products/tamron/lenses/tamron_18-270_3p5-6p3_vc_pzd/specifications

External links

Superzoom lenses
18-270B
Camera lenses introduced in 2010